Sidhani is a village situated on the Haryana-Punjab border in the Fatehabad district of Haryana state, India.

Villages in Fatehabad district